Ruby Lafayette (July 22, 1844 – April 3, 1935) was an American film actress, known for Sue of the South (1919), Big Bob (1921) and The Man Trap (1917). She was married to John T. Curran.

At age 82, Lafayette nearly died from injuries sustained when she was hit by a car.

She died in Los Angeles on April 3, 1935.

Filmography
 Mother O' Mine - Mrs. Standing - 1917
 The Man Trap - Mrs. Mull - 1917 
 The Kaiser, the Beast of Berlin - Grandmother Marcas - 1917 
 Beauty in Chains - Doña Perfecta (as Ruby La Fayette) - 1918 
 Three Mounted Men - Mrs. Masters - 1918 
 The Yellow Dog - Mrs. Blakely - 1918 
 The Strange Woman - Mrs. Hemingway - 1918 
 Sue of the South - Granny Sue Gordon (as Ruby La Fayette) - 1918 
 Rustling a Bride - Aunt (as Ruby LaFayette) - 1919 
 Cyclone Smith Plays Trumps (Short) - 1919 
 In His Brother's Place - Amanda Drake (as Ruby La Fayette) - 1919 
 The Miracle Man – (uncredited) old lady Chaney pushes in wheelbarrow - 1919 
 Toby's Bow - Grandmother - 1919 
 Polly of the Storm Country - Granny Hope - 1920 
 Old Lady 31 - Granny - 1920 
 Big Bob (Short) - Bob's Mother - 1920 
 Borderland - Eileen - 1921 
 Catch My Smoke - Mrs. Archer - 1922 
 The Power of a Lie - Mrs. Hammond - 1922 
 Hollywood - Grandmother Whitaker - 1922 
 The Day of Faith - Granny Maynard - 1923 
 The Phantom Horseman - Maxwell's Mother - 1924 
 Idle Tongues - Miss Pepper - 1924 
 Tomorrow's Love - Grandmother - 1925 
 The Coming of Amos - Nadia's Nurse - 1925 
 The Wedding Song - Mother - 1925 
 Butterflies in the Rain - Mrs. Humphries - 1925 
 Marriage by Contract - Grandma - 1926 
 Not So Dumb - Grandma (uncredited) 1928 
 If I Had a Million  - Idylwood Resident (uncredited) 1932

References

External links

 
 "Obituaries", Variety, April 10, 1935 p. 62.

American film actresses
1844 births
1935 deaths
People from Bracken County, Kentucky